Adeleke Adekunle (born 27 July 2002) is a Nigerian professional footballer who currently plays as a defender for Enyimba
.

Career statistics

Club

Notes

International

References

2002 births
Living people
Nigerian footballers
Nigeria international footballers
Association football defenders
Abia Warriors F.C. players
Enyimba F.C. players
People from Maiduguri